DWFM (92.3 FM), broadcasting as 92.3 Radyo5 TRUE FM, is a radio station owned by the Nation Broadcasting Corporation and operated by TV5 Network. It serves as the flagship station of the Radyo5 network, which is one of the assets of News5. The station's studio is located in TV5 Media Center, Reliance cor. Sheridan Sts., Brgy. Buayang Bato, Mandaluyong, while its transmitter is located in NBC compound, Block 3, Emerald Hills, Sumulong Highway, Antipolo. This station operates daily from 4 a.m. to 12 midnight.

As of Q4 2022, Radyo5 is the 7th most-listened to FM radio station (and #3 among news radio stations) in Metro Manila, based on a survey commissioned by Kantar Media Philippines and Kapisanan ng mga Brodkaster ng Pilipinas.

History

1973–1998: MRS
DWFM signed on in 1973 as MRS 92.3 (MRS meaning Most Requested Song), Manila's third FM station at that time. Having an adult contemporary format during its existence, the station is known for playing the most requested song every hour. DWFM quickly became the top-rated FM station in Manila, and held this title for most of its existence. The success of DWFM led NBC to establish other FM stations using a similar format, including Cebu's DYNC in 1975, and Davao's DXFM.

Its first home was in Jacinta Building 1 along Pasay Road (near the Ayala Center complex). It later on moved to the NBC Tower/Jacinta Building 2 (now as ACQ Tower) along EDSA, Guadalupe, Makati.

1998–2007: Joey
In September 1998, NBC was acquired by MediaQuest Holdings, Inc., a broadcasting company owned by the PLDT's Beneficial Trust Fund from the consortium of the Yabut family and then House Speaker Manny Villar. In November 1998, DWFM switched to a smooth jazz station as Joey @ Rhythms 92.3. Radio executive Francis Lumen assumed the position of president and CEO bringing with him his previous 10 years of managing Citylite 88.3 (now Jam 88.3). The call letters were also changed to DZRU.

The jazz format would also be implemented on all of NBC's other FM stations, who used other female names for their branding. It was also during this period that NBC entered into a joint venture with MTV Asia for an MTV Philippines feed via NBC's UHF Network (Channel 41). The station also featured new-age music during the Paschal Triduum of the annual Holy Week during that era, which is dubbed as "Take 20".

In 2004, the Rhythms tag was dropped, thus becoming 923 Joey (pronounced as "nine-two-three"), with the station slogan "It's a Groove Thing". In January 2007, the station was taken over by new management, led by radio executives Raymund Miranda and Al Torres (currently as a voiceover for GMA Network, GTV, Heart of Asia Channel, and I Heart Movies currently based in Canada), along with sales executive Amy Victa. Together with the new team, the butterfly was dropped from the logo and the official call letters were returned to DWFM, the original call letters of the station.

2007–2009: XFM
On Easter Sunday, April 8, 2007, the station was relaunched as 92.3 xFM, airing downtempo, trip hop and house music. It also reverted its call letters back to DWFM. In August 2007, easy listening tracks were added to the station's playlist, which led to the scrapping of the electronica format in January 2008.

In February 2008, the station reverted to its smooth jazz format. Now known as XFM 92.3, it adopted the slogans "Stress Free Radio", "Cool, Hip, Light, Smooth and all that Jazz" and "Light N Up!".

2009–2010: U92
On October 1, 2009, All Youth Channels, owner of the now-defunct MTV Philippines, took over the station's operations and rebranded it as U92 with the youth-oriented slogan "Cool To Be U". It carried a contemporary hit radio format, which was also tightly cross-promoted and shared talent with MTV Philippines, which had been broadcast by NBC's stations until mid-2007 when AYC took over the MTV franchise in the country and converted it to a cable-only service. Thus, the on-air personalities are a mix of former and current MTV Philippines VJ's, celebrities and career radio people. At that time, its studios moved from NBC Tower to Silver City Mall in Pasig.

On October 1, 2010, U92 transitioned to a fully automated station, eight months after MTV Philippines shut down on February 15, which signified another branding to the station.

2010–present: Radyo5

On November 8, 2010, after almost a month of test broadcast, DWFM made another first in the history of FM radio broadcasting in the Philippines, as the station flipped to a news/talk format as Radyo5 92.3 News FM; becoming the flagship station for a new radio network operated in conjunction with the news department of TV5 (which PLDT media subsidiary MediaQuest recently acquired a majority stake of in earlier in the year). At that time the station's studios moved again from Silver City Mall in Pasig to TV5 Studio Complex in Novaliches, Quezon City. The move came as part of a plan to expand TV5's news operation in order to become more competitive with the other major networks, which also included the launch of a news network on NBC's television stations, AksyonTV (which also simulcasts some of its programming until its shutdown in 2019). Most of the personalities are former anchors and reporters from different AM-radio stations in Mega Manila including Neil Ocampo, Laila Chikadora, Cheryl Cosim, Cristy Fermin, Christine Bersola-Babao, Ted Failon, Chacha Guevarra, Jun Banaag (from DZMM), Raffy Tulfo, Nina Taduran, Ruel Otieco, JV Arcena, Sharee Roman (from DZXL), Arnell Ignacio, Shalala (from DZBB), Izza Reniva-Cruz (from Veritas 846), Zony Esguerra (from DZME) and TV5 news anchors Julius Babao and Jay Taruc.

In less than six months under the new format, Radyo5 ranked as the fourth most listened to FM stations in Metro Manila. In March 2012, the Radio Research Council ranked Radyo5 as the number 1 news radio station in the market in a survey of motorists. Afterwards, in 2013, Radyo5 was declared again by the PSRC Car Coincidental Survey as the most preferred & listened FM station for public utility vehicles including jeepneys, taxis and FX.

On December 23, 2013, Radyo5 studios (including News5) moved from the TV5 Studio Complex in Novaliches, Quezon City to their new home at TV5 Media Center along Reliance Street, Mandaluyong.

In 2017, a series of budget cuts were imposed by TV5's management. Among those affected were Radyo5's overnight operations. The network changed broadcast times twice until February 16, 2018, when they made a permanent daily 20 hour run (4:00 am until midnight), adding music content during early morning and late-night (except during radio coverage of doubleheader PBA game days).

On November 8, 2022, coinciding with the 12th anniversary of the station, it launched its new slogan "Ito ang Totoong Tunog ng Serbisyo Publiko" (This is the Genuine Sound of Public Service), voiced by Martin Andanar.

During TV5's trade launch, Radyo5 announced its plans for its relaunching scheduled January 23, 2023, along with new programs, and its expansion to key cities nationwide.

On March 8, 2023, Radyo5 changed its sub-brand to TRUE FM and adopted the slogan "Dito Tayo sa Totoo"; it also unveiled its first-ever jingle for the station composed and arranged by Francis de Veyra on the same day. The word "TRUE" also serves as an acronym for the tenets that Radyo5 follows for responsible and community-centered broadcasting to be recognized as the country's leading public service go-to radio station, represented by its own shows. T stands for truth in journalism as heard on the station's flaghsip news programs, R for real people and stories as featured in programs that are relatable and resonate with listeners, U for unwavering commitment to public service where the programs offer a platform for listeners to air concerns and be provided with assistance or advice, and E for entertainment through daily doses of showbiz and lifestyle updates.

One PH

After the shutdown of AksyonTV on January 13, 2019, Radyo5 programs began broadcasting in a Cignal-exclusive "teleradyo" channel, One PH, which was initially launched on February 18 and officially launched on July 31. Coinciding with the said launch, Radyo5 was added with new studios and programs, and re-extended its weekday broadcast hours.

Starting August and September 2019, selected Radyo5 and One PH programs (Morning Calls, One Balita, One Balita Pilipinas, Wag Po! and Turbo Time with Mike and Lindy) begin its airing on either simulcast or delayed basis on The 5 Network as part of programming revamp spearheaded by TV5 Network's new CEO Jane Basas.

On March 17, 2020, Radyo5, along with One PH, temporarily suspended its regular programming as an effect of the Luzon-wide "enhanced community quarantine" against COVID-19. The radio station aired the special edition of One News Now and automated music throughout the day. However, regular programs resumed after a few months.

In December 2020, Cignal TV and Philstar Media Group took over the operations and programming of Radyo Singko, respectively. With this development, some of the station's programs aired their respective final episodes during the final weeks of December 2020. On January 1, 2021, One PH's programming (except for overnight slots) have been integrated to the programming schedule of Radyo Singko and all the music blocks have been removed. The new management retained the radio coverage rights of PBA games, in which its existing exclusive contract between PBA and One Sports (formerly Sports5 and ESPN5) expired by the end of 2022. 

The integrated programming of Radyo Singko and One PH ended upon the launch of the former's new inhouse programs in January 2023, though its Saturday programming remains intact. Starting January 29, 2023, its integrated Sunday programming, except for Sunday Mass and Word of God Network, was axed and replaced it with music programming.

Programming

Notable presenters

Current
 Sen. Raffy Tulfo
 Ted Failon
 Cheryl Cosim
 Jove Francisco
 Cristy Fermin
 Mon Gualvez
 Noli Eala
 Lourd de Veyra
 Danton Remoto
 Laila Chikadora
 Stanley Chi
 Christine Bersola-Babao

Former
 Martin Andanar
 Orly Mercado (now a substitute for Ted Failon at DJ Chacha sa Radyo5)
 Erwin Tulfo 
 Luchi Cruz-Valdes
 Ben Tulfo
 Amy Perez
 Jay Taruc (now with One PH)
 Julius Babao (now with One PH)
 Amelyn Veloso (now deceased)
 Manuel Mogato
 Paolo Bediones
 Cherie Mercado
 Bayani Agbayani
 Richard Gordon

See also
TV5 Network
One Sports
One PH
DWET-TV
News5
Nation Broadcasting Corporation
List of television and radio stations owned by TV5 Network

References

External links
News5 Website

News and talk radio stations in the Philippines
92.3 Radyo5 TRUE FM
Radio stations established in 1973